Nikolai Myaskovsky's Symphony No. 16 in F major, op. 39, was composed in 1935-6 and has the nickname Aviation Symphony.

The Symphony is in four movements:
Allegro vivace
Andantino e semplice, in B major
Sostenuto. Andante marciale, ma sostenuto in A minor
Tempo precedente. Allegro ma non troppo (A minor followed by F major)

Myaskovsky is said to have told his biographer Alexey Ikonnikov that the slow movement of the symphony was  inspired by the crash of the Tupolev ANT-20 "Maksim Gorky".  However, Patrick Zuk goes on: "One suspects that this 'content' was bestowed on the movement retrospectively ... there is no mention of the crash, or indeed, anything to do with aviation in Myaskovsky's own programme note." 

The premiere was on 24 October 1936, in Moscow with the Moscow Philharmonic conducted by E. Szenkar.

The first movement begins with a triplet accompaniment and a chromatic main theme.  The second movement is a dance-like intermezzo.  This is followed by a funeral march, and following without pause, a finale that quotes a song written by Myaskovsky, "The Aeroplanes are Flying".

References

Sources
 

16
1936 compositions
Compositions in F major
1936 in the Soviet Union
Aviation music